This is a list of people in the Canadian province of Quebec of Irish ancestry.

Charles McKiernan (1835-1889) - Montreal tavern owner, innkeeper and philanthropist; known as Joe Beef
Patrice Bergeron - professional ice hockey centre
Geneviève Bujold -  actor
Robert Burns - politician
Lawrence Cannon -  former Minister of Transport, Infrastructure and Communities
Jean Charest - former Premier of Quebec
Jim Corcoran - singer-songwriter
Charles Doherty - Federal Minister in the Borden government
Georges Dor - singer-songwriter, author, poet
Jennifer Finnigan - actress
Charles Fitzpatrick - Chief Justice, Supreme Court of Canada
Edmund James Flynn - former Premier of Quebec
Sir William Hales Hingston - 16th Mayor of Montreal; Conservative Senator
Daniel Johnson, Sr. - former Premier of Quebec
Daniel Johnson, Jr. - former Premier of Quebec
Pierre-Marc Johnson - former Premier of Quebec
Jean-Baptiste Kelly - Roman Catholic Vicar-general
Larkin Kerwin - first President of the Canadian Space Agency
Eric Kierans - politician
Donovan King - theatre activist, creator of infringement Festival
La Bolduc, née Mary Rose-Anna Travers - musician
Bernard Lonergan - philosopher, theologian
John Lynch-Staunton - politician
Paul Martin, Jr. - 21st Prime Minister of Canada
Kate and Anna McGarrigle - Québécois folklore musicians
Thomas D'Arcy McGee - father of Canadian Confederation
John McLoughlin - doctor and Factor with Hudson's Bay Company, "father of Oregon"
James McShane - 21st Mayor of Montreal, Member of Parliament, Member of Provincial Parliament
Thomas Mulcair - Member of Parliament; Leader of the Opposition; former Member of the National Assembly
Brian Mulroney - 18th Prime Minister of Canada
Bryan Murray - (Terry's brother) former National Hockey League coach and general manager
Terry Murray - (Bryan's brother) former National Hockey League player and coach
Émile Nelligan - known as the national poet of Quebec
Robert Nelson - doctor and Lower Canada Rebellion leader
Wolfred Nelson - doctor and supporter of the Lower Canada Rebellion
Edmund Bailey O'Callaghan - doctor and supporter of the Lower Canada Rebellion
Michael Grattan O'Leary - politician 
Patrick Roy - former professional ice hockey goalie
Claude Ryan - journalist and leader of the Opposition
Frank Ryan - gangster
Yves Ryan - Mayor of Montréal-Nord
Louis St. Laurent - 12th Prime Minister of Canada
Robert Scully - journalist and commentator; former host of Venture on CBC Television and Scully Rencontre on SRC Télévision
Kevin Tierney - film producer
Daniel Tracey - doctor, newspaper editor, Parti Patriote supporter
William Workman - former Mayor of Montreal

See also
List of Quebecers
Irish influence on Quebec culture
Irish roots of Québécois reel music
Irish Quebecers
Irish diaspora
Irish Canadians
Irish Americans
Culture of Ireland
Culture of Quebec

External links
United Irish Societies of Montreal

Culture of Quebec
Irish
Quebec

Irish
Irish